Hrkljuš is a fictional sport created for the TV show Top lista nadrealista which was very popular in Yugoslavia in the 1980s. In one episode of the show, a game appeared to be broadcast live.

Rules
The players (any number) stand in a circle, at arms' length from each other. The leader of the game throws a ball (made of mops) to someone in the circle. Players continue passing the ball to each other. When the ball falls from someone's hands, that player hits himself in forehead with his fist, and yells: "Domene!" (meaning My bad!). When the leader of the game yells: "Hrkljuš!", the owner of the ball is the winner. "Hrkljuš" is any player who is out of the game.  When only one player remains in the game, he is declared the winner.

Pop-culture influence
In 1991, a computer game for Commodore 64 was launched by the Radojević brothers from Arilje. Besides the standard rules (ball throwing and hitting own forehead with fist), a league competition mode was also introduced.

"Hrkljuš" immediately found its place in slang of ex-Yugoslav languages. It usually means:
 something stupid, with no sense at all;
 obstinately insisting on doing something the wrong way;
 taking part in a situation with vague rules;
 persistence on backwardness and anachronistic habits.

See also
 Top lista nadrealista
 New Primitivism

References

External links
 Hrkljuš on YouTube
 Hrkljuš on Hrkljuš.com (archived)

Fictional ball games
Top lista nadrealista